Ogof Llyn Parc usually known as Pool Park is a cave on Esclusham Mountain above Wrexham, Wales, that has a  entrance shaft, normally descended by winch to the mine levels.  Further caving and two ladders reaches the natural cave levels in which there are streamways.

References

External links
 North Wales Caving Club
 Countryside Council for Wales

Llyn Parc
Landforms of Wrexham County Borough